Anthony Zee (b. 1945) (Zee comes from /ʑi23/, the Shanghainese pronunciation of 徐) is a Chinese-American physicist, writer, and currently a professor at the Kavli Institute for Theoretical Physics and the physics department of the University of California, Santa Barbara.

After graduating from Princeton University, Zee obtained his PhD from Harvard University in 1970, supervised by Sidney Coleman. During 1970–72 and 1977–78, he was at the Institute for Advanced Study. From 1973 to 1978, he was an Alfred P. Sloan Fellow. In his first year as assistant professor at Princeton, Zee had Ed Witten as his teaching assistant and grader.

Zee has authored or co-authored more than 200 scientific publications and several books. He has written on particle physics, condensed matter physics, anomalies in physics, random matrix theory, superconductivity, the quantum Hall effect, and other topics in theoretical physics and evolutionary biology, as well as their various interrelations.

Zee is an accomplished teacher, covering both general relativity and quantum field theory. The culmination of his teaching is his highly regarded and widely praised "trilogy" of graduate level textbooks: Quantum Field Theory in a Nutshell, Einstein Gravity in a Nutshell, and Group Theory in a Nutshell for Physicists. He is also the author of several books for general readers about physics and Chinese culture.

Books
Technical:
1982. Unity of Forces in the Universe. Singapore: World Scientific.
2010. Quantum Field Theory in a Nutshell. 2nd ed. Princeton University Press. 
2013. Einstein Gravity in a Nutshell. Princeton University Press. 
2016. Group Theory in a Nutshell for Physicists. Princeton University Press. 
2020. 
General readers:
1989. An Old Man's Toy, Oxford University Press. 
1990. Swallowing Clouds. University of Washington Press. 
2007. Fearful Symmetry: The Search for Beauty in Modern Physics, 2nd ed. Princeton University Press. Foreword by Roger Penrose. . 1986 1st ed. published by Macmillan; 2016 pbk edition published by Princeton University Press 
2018. 
2023.

Notes

External links

Anthony Zee's Personal Web Page
  (lectures given in 2004)
 
 
 
 
 

Living people
Harvard University alumni
University of California, Santa Barbara faculty
21st-century American physicists
Particle physicists
1945 births
Princeton University alumni
Institute for Advanced Study visiting scholars
American people of Chinese descent
People from Kunming
Scientists from Yunnan
Sloan Fellows